Sebree is a home rule-class city in Webster County, Kentucky, in the United States. The population was 1,603 at the 2010 census.

History
Sebree was founded as a railroad town in 1868, just ahead of the arrival of the Louisville and Nashville Railroad in October. The town founders, William Scott and Col. E.G. Sebree, intended to name it Springdale after nearby natural springs, but the name was preëmpted by another community in Mason County. The post office was initially named McBride, but renamed for Col. Sebree (the first president of the St. Bernard Mining Company) in 1870 for his assistance in bringing the railroad to this part of the state.

The L&N depot was on the eastern side of the track and furnished with day and night operators. At one time, Sebree was home to some 40 businesses, hotels, shops and stores. The first nondenominational church was erected in 1870. It was quickly followed by Methodist, Catholic, and Baptist churches. The town was also home to Sebree Springs, a summer resort and park operated by G.L. Dial. Telephone service arrived in 1895, and several tobacco factories were also built.

The historic Sebree Deposit Bank is still in operation with a refurbished interior including a marble floor. Another historic site in the area is the Queen Anne McMullin-Warren House.

Geography
Sebree is located at  (37.608104, -87.529356).

Demographics

As of the census of 2000, there were 1,558 people, 573 households, and 374 families residing in the city. The racial makeup of the city was 93.77% White, 0.64% African American, 0.19% Native American, 0.06% Pacific Islander, 5.01% from other races, and 0.32% from two or more races. Hispanic or Latino of any race were 11.30% of the population.

There were 573 households, out of which 31.1% had children under the age of 18 living with them, 48.0% were married couples living together, 10.8% had a female householder with no husband present, and 34.6% were non-families. 28.6% of all households were made up of individuals, and 12.2% had someone living alone who was 65 years of age or older. The average household size was 2.54 and the average family size was 3.00.

In the city, the population was spread out, with 23.3% under the age of 18, 11.6% from 18 to 24, 27.8% from 25 to 44, 20.0% from 45 to 64, and 17.3% who were 65 years of age or older. The median age was 36 years. For every 100 females, there were 96.2 males. For every 100 females age 18 and over, there were 98.5 males.

The median income for a household in the city was $29,663, and the median income for a family was $35,221. Males had a median income of $21,379 versus $18,438 for females. The per capita income for the city was $14,339. About 17.4% of families and 22.3% of the population were below the poverty line, including 31.9% of those under age 18 and 12.4% of those age 65 or over.

Climate
The climate in this area is characterized by hot, humid summers and generally mild to cool winters. According to the Köppen Climate Classification system, Sebree has a humid subtropical climate, abbreviated "Cfa" on climate maps.

Media

The Sebree Banner is a weekly newspaper and one of the media outlets of CPC Newspaper Group. The masthead states that it is Webster County's Oldest Newspaper. As per Harris Industrial Directory published in 1995, the paper was established in 1885, the paper has four employees, has sales under $500K, and is privately owned. The newspaper is archived in Google newspapers.

Education
Webster County School District operates public schools, including Sebree Elementary, Webster County Middle School and Webster County High School.

See also 
 Sebree Station
 WREF (FM)

References

Populated places established in 1868
Cities in Webster County, Kentucky
Cities in Kentucky
Evansville metropolitan area